St John's Marlborough (formerly St John's School and Community College) is a mixed secondary school with academy status in Marlborough, Wiltshire, England, for students aged 11 to 18.  the school has 1,635 students. The school opened in 1975 and is in the south of the town.

History
The school was formed in 1975 as a new comprehensive school, taking over the buildings and many of the staff of the recently closed Marlborough Royal Free Grammar School and the Marlborough Secondary Modern School on Chopping Knife Lane. The grammar school had been founded in 1550. The school's Savernake building was the former secondary modern school.

In 1998 the school was awarded its first specialism in Technology and in 2005 its second in Languages. After the rebuilding of the school on a new site at Granham Hill, the buildings of two former schools were demolished in 2010.

The school converted to academy status in September 2012. It is run by the Excalibur Academies Trust, a multi-academy trust which includes several local primary schools and John O'Gaunt School, Hungerford.

Buildings
After the amalgamation of the grammar and secondary modern schools, the school operated on two separate sites. Building work for a new school started on site in June 2008, at an estimated cost of £26.5M. The new building was brought into use in late 2009 and was officially opened by Camilla, Duchess of Cornwall in 2010.

The new building was designed by Re-Format, formerly Format Milton Architects. The single-site project had been many years in the planning due to delays obtaining planning permission for the development of the other site, and complaints from local residents.

Notable alumni
 Aaron Hicklin – editor of Out magazine
 Lauren Child – children's author and illustrator
 Rhys Thornbury – skeleton athlete
 Dr Phil Hammond – physician, journalist, broadcaster, comedian and commentator

References

External links

 Excalibur Academies Trust

Secondary schools in Wiltshire
Academies in Wiltshire
Educational institutions established in 1975
1975 establishments in England

Marlborough, Wiltshire